Jan Romuald Byzewski, better known in America as Father Romuald Byzewski, was born in the Kaszubian village of Karwia, in the Prussian jurisdiction of Danzig (Gdansk), on October 10, 1842.

Biography
After graduating from secondary school in Wejherowo he entered the Franciscan Recollect Province as a novice on February 7, 1861. Since this was the feast of Saint Romuald. he added the name Romuald to his own. He was ordained to the Roman Catholic priesthood at Liège, Belgium, on August 5, 1866. After his ordination, Reverend Byzewski became professor of philosophy and theology at the Franciscan seminary in Łąki Bratiańskie, Poland. In 1875, at the height of the Kulturkampf, the Congregations Law was enacted, effectively forbidding Roman Catholic religious orders to operate within the Prussian Empire. Reverend Byzewski was consequently permitted to leave the Franciscans and emigrate to the United States, thereby becoming part of the Kaszubian diaspora.

Reverend Byzewski arrived in New York on August 13, 1875, aboard the SS Mosel. His first service in America was as pastor of Saint Stanislaus Kostka Parish in Winona, Minnesota. He served in this role until 1890, helped no doubt by his Kashubian heritage in a city which came to be known as the "Kashubian Capital of America." He established a school for the parish, brought in the School Sisters of Notre Dame to teach there, and served as a capable intermediary between the English-speaking majority and the bumptious Kaszubian Poles. As a stalwart supporter of the Polish Roman Catholic Union of America he also established the newspaper Wiarus, which quickly became the United States's leading Polish-language periodical, under the editorship of the mercurial Kaszubian poet Hieronim Derdowski. According to the historian-priest Reverend Waclaw Kruszka, unexplained “disagreements and difficulties” may have sped Father Byzewski's departure from Winona.

An 1890 city directory for Milwaukee, Wisconsin lists Reverend Byzewski as an assistant pastor at Saint Stanislaus Church at 404 Mitchell Street. Yet by June 1890, he was in Detroit, Michigan directing the foundation of that city's fifth Polish parish, Saint Francis of Assisi. In 1898 he was transferred to Sweetest Heart of Mary Roman Catholic Church, also in Detroit. In 1899, Reverend Byzewski was granted readmission to the Franciscan Order, and relocated to Pulaski, Wisconsin. There he was a pastor for parishes and served as the first rector of Saint Bonaventure College.

Reverend Jan Romuald Byzewski died in Green Bay, Wisconsin, on October 30, 1905. His grave is at Franciscan Fathers Cemetery in Pittsville, Wisconsin.

References

External links

1842 births
1905 deaths
American people of Kashubian descent
People from Winona, Minnesota
Religious leaders from Milwaukee
19th-century Polish Roman Catholic priests
Kashubian clergy
Roman Catholic Archdiocese of Milwaukee
Roman Catholic Diocese of Winona-Rochester
People from Pulaski, Wisconsin
Catholics from Wisconsin
Catholics from Minnesota
19th-century American Roman Catholic priests